Holmen Church (Holmen Kirke) is the principal parish church  for Sigdal municipality in the Diocese of Tunsberg. It is located at Prestfoss in Sigdal municipality, Viken county, Norway. Access to the church is via Fv133 and Rv287.

History
The cruciform church, which seats 750, was constructed of wood. It was built on the basis of drawings made by Gustav Adolph Lammers (1802–1878) based upon his designs for Bamble Church in Vestfold og Telemark. Holmen Church was dedicated on November 9, 1853 by Jens Lauritz Arup, Bishop of Oslo. The closing hymn was written by the resident chaplain at Olberg Church in Krødsherad, Jørgen Moe, later Bishop in the Diocese of Agder.

Holmen Church was built as a replacement for the former  Holmen Stave Church (Holmen gamle kirkested) which was demolished in 1855. The pulpit and baptismal font from the stave church are used in Holmen Church. The altarpiece was painted by Axel Ender (1853-1920) and dates from 1877. It features the Crucifixion of Jesus. Two bells in the tower are both cast by O. Olsen & Søn klokkestøperi in Tønsberg. They date from 1853 and 1856.

References

Other Sources
Skatvedt, Thormod (1914) Sigdal's Main Church (translated by Rosella Goettelman in "Sigdalslag". February, 2010. Volume 30, Issue 1)

External links
Holmen kirke

Sigdal
Churches in Viken
Churches completed in 1853
19th-century Church of Norway church buildings
Cruciform churches in Norway
Wooden churches in Norway